The  ('five musical instruments') is a set of five traditional Nepali musical instruments that are played during holy ceremonies, especially marriages.  are usually played by the Damai and the Gaine castes in the Hindu tradition. They are played using the rhythm of folk Nepali songs.It is named as Panchje Baja because in Nepali panch ( ५ ) means 5 and the set includes five different types of instruments and baaja means musical instruments.

 Components 
The  includes the jhyali (cymbals), or dholak (drums), damaha (large kettledrum), narsinga (a long, C-shaped trumpet), shehnai (a folk oboe), and karnal (a wide-mouthed, straight trumpet with a bell that resembles the datura flower). Other than that, there is not a fixed rule on how many instruments  should contain. 

 Condition of Panche Baja 
Despite its cultural significance, the traditional Nepalese musical ensemble  "panche baja" is gradually losing popularity as fewer people continue to show interest in playing it. However, there are efforts to revive it, such as by Nepalese startups like Baja Nepal and other local initiatives who are working to promote panche baja in the country.

References''

Nepalese musical instruments
Types of musical groups
Khas culture